Zuripujo (possibly from Aymara suri rhea, phuju spring of water, "rhea spring") is a  mountain in the Andes of southern Peru. It is situated in the Tacna Region, Candarave Province, Candarave District. It is southeast of the Tutupaca volcano.

Zuripujo is also the name of an intermittent stream which originates north of the mountain. It flows to the east.

References

Mountains of Peru
Mountains of Tacna Region